Lemyra murzinorum is a moth of the family Erebidae. It was described by Vladimir Viktorovitch Dubatolov in 2007. It is found in Sichuan, China.

References

 

murzinorum
Moths described in 2007